The Flying Scotsman is a Grade II listed public house at 2–4 Caledonian Road, Kings Cross, London.

It was originally called The Scottish Stores, and was designed by the architects Wylson and Long, probably for James Kirk, and built in 1900–01.

The Flying Scotsman closed in November 2015, and re-opened as The Scottish Stores (its original name) in December 2015, as a pub specialising in craft beer.

The pub features in the 1999 film The Protagonists.

References

Grade II listed buildings in the London Borough of Islington
Grade II listed pubs in London
Pubs in the London Borough of Islington
Kings Cross, London